The Calipt'Air Serenis is a Swiss single-place, paraglider that was designed and produced by Calipt'Air of Spiez. It is now out of production.

Design and development
The Serenis was designed as an intermediate glider. The models are each named for their relative size.

Operational history
Reviewer Noel Bertrand described the Serenis in a 2003 review as "lively and very easy to fly".

Variants
Serenis S
Small-sized model for lighter pilots. The glider model is DHV 1-2 certified.
Serenis M
Mid-sized model for medium-weight pilots. The glider model is DHV 1-2 certified.
Serenis L
Large-sized model for heavier pilots. The glider model is DHV 1-2 certified.

Specifications (Serenis L)

References

Serenis
Paragliders